The Mercury Tracer is an automobile manurfactured and marketed by Ford's  Mercury division for model years 1987-1999, over three generations in three- and five-door hatchback, four-door sedan, and five-door station wagon configurations.

The first generation was marketed as a subcompact; the two succeeding generations were sold in the compact segment.  All three generations derived from the Mazda 323/Protegé. 

After 1999, Mercury ended sales of the Tracer; while the Ford Escort was later replaced by the Ford Focus, Mercury exited the compact segment.  A planned Tracer fourth generation was projected for 2012, cancelled by the closure of the Mercury brand at the end of 2010.

First generation (1987–1989)

For 1987, Mercury introduced the Tracer as its subcompact model range to replace the Lynx.  The first Mercury-brand vehicle assembled outside of North America, the Tracer was a counterpart of the Ford Laser (itself a variant of the Mazda 323) sold in Asia-Pacific markets.  

The first Tracers went on sale in Canada in early October 1986.  In the United States, the model line went on sale in March 1987 and would be sold alongside the Lynx until the end of the model year. For 1988, a 5-door station wagon was introduced as a third body style. The Tracer had nearly no United States parts content and as such did not count towards lowering Ford's Corporate Average Fuel Economy (CAFE).

Canadian production (three-door and five-door hatchbacks) was sourced from Ford Lio Ho in Taiwan. Three-door hatchbacks, five-door hatchbacks, and the later station wagons were assembled by Ford in Mexico by Hermosillo Stamping & Assembly for the United States. Mexican assembly of the first generation Tracer ended in August 1989, with late examples sold as "89 1/2" models into calendar year 1990. In spite of the cancellation, Tracer sales in the United States actually picked up in model year 1989. In Canada, Tracer imports ended during 1989, with sales slowing to a trickle by the end of the year. 5,489 Tracers were sold in Canada in calendar year 1988, followed by 1,775 cars in 1989.

Chassis 
The Mercury Tracer is an American counterpart of the Australian-market Ford Laser KE, sold in Japan, Asia, and South Africa. While sharing a slightly different body, the Laser shared a common chassis with the front-wheel drive Mazda 323, designated the Mazda BF platform.  

A 1.6-litre B6 inline-four from the 323 was offered with the Tracer. For Canadian-market examples, a 71-hp carbureted engine was offered, with an 84-hp fuel-injected engine offered in the United States. A 5-speed manual was standard, with a 3-speed automatic offered as an option.

Body 
In line with its Lynx predecessor, the Tracer was offered as in 3-door and 5-door hatchback configurations; for the United States, a 5-door station wagon made in Mexico was also offered. Sharing its body panels with the Ford Laser, the Tracer was distinguished by a Mercury grille, badging, and wheel covers; slight revisions were made to the hatchback and station wagon liftgate. Unlike the hatchbacks, the Tracer Wagon received identical sheetmetal to the 323 Wagon. Along with a base L trim, the Tracer was offered in GS and LS trim, in line with the Topaz, Sable, and Grand Marquis model lines.

Second generation (1991–1996)

After skipping the 1990 model year altogether, Lincoln-Mercury released the second-generation Mercury Tracer in early 1990 as an early 1991 model.  While remaining a counterpart of the Ford Laser, the redesign also made it a Mercury counterpart of the American Ford Escort (alongside the renamed Mazda Protegé sedan).         

In another shift, the Tracer grew in size, shifting from the subcompact to the compact segment, with all assembly consolidated at Hermosillo Stamping in Mexico. North American parts content was considerably higher than for the preceding generation. 

The Mercury Tracer LTS was named to Car and Driver magazine's Ten Best list for 1991.

Chassis 
The second-generation Tracer is derived from the front-wheel drive Mazda BG platform (officially designated the Ford CT120 platform), sharing a 98.4-inch wheelbase with the Escort and Protegé. An  1.9-liter CVH inline-four is the standard engine (shared with the Escort). From 1991 to 1994, a 127-hp 1.8-liter Mazda BP inline-four (shared with the Ford Escort GT and Mazda Protegé LX) was offered. A 5-speed manual was standard with both engines, with a 4-speed automatic offered with the 1.9L engine.

Body 
The second-generation Tracer was offered in two configurations; along with the station wagon, a four-door sedan replaced the previous hatchbacks (offered as an Escort).  While sharing almost no body panels with its Mazda counterpart, the Tracer differed little from the Escort, with the latter distinguished largely by amber turn signal lenses.      

Throughout the second-generation Tracer's production run, only two trim levels were available: an unnamed base model sedan and wagon, and the LTS (Luxury Touring Sedan), which served as the flagship of the model range.  Largely the counterpart of the Ford Escort LX-E (the four-door equivalent to the Ford Escort GT), the LTS was powered by a  Mazda 1.8-liter engine; the LTS was produced through the 1996 model year. For 1994, a "Trio" package became available on the base Tracer sedan and wagon. The Trio package featured a leather-wrapped steering wheel, 7-spoke aluminum wheels (Shared with the Ford Escort LX Sport) and a "Trio" decal on each fender; Tracer sedans with the Trio package also featured rear decklid spoilers. The package continued to be available through 1996.

During its production, the second-generation Tracer saw few external changes. For 1991, the base model Tracer sedan and wagon were styled with a body-color front grille, while the LTS featured a light-bar grille; the base model received the LTS's grille for 1993. Also for 1993, the Tracer was given a drivers' side airbag as a passive restraint, replacing automatic seatbelts; for 1994, the addition of a passenger airbag required a redesign of the dashboard.

Third generation (1997–1999)

For 1997, Lincoln-Mercury released the third-generation Mercury Tracer, sharing a redesign alongside the American Ford Escort.  While sharing the same chassis underpinnings as the previous generation, the powertrain and body underwent substantial revisions.  

The third generation is the only version to be assembled entirely in the United States, with all assembly consolidated at Wayne Stamping & Assembly in Wayne, Michigan.   

Following the 1999 model year, the Tracer was withdrawn (along with the Escort station wagon). For 1999, 23,146 examples were sold. The final Mercury Tracer rolled off the assembly line on July 2, 1999.

Chassis 
The third-generation Tracer is derived from the front-wheel drive Ford CT120 platform, used again by Ford, sharing the same 98.4-inch wheelbase as the previous generation. The sole engine is a  2.0-litre CVH Split-Port Induction (SPI) inline-four, paired with either a 5-speed manual or a 4-speed automatic transmission.

Body 
The third-generation Tracer again was offered in four-door sedan and five-door station wagon configurations (with the Escort hatchbacks withdrawn altogether). The Tracer largely was distinguished from the Escort by its front fascia and taillamps, along with model-specific wheelcovers. The Tracer station wagon carried over much of the second-generation bodyshell, with updates limited to the front fascia, sideview mirrors, door handles, badging, and dashboard.   

As with previous generations, the third-generation Tracer was sold in GS and LS trims, with Mercury also offering a Trio appearance package for the GS. The LS trim was distinguished by alloy wheels, leather interior, keyless entry, power windows and door locks, and tachometer.

Proposed 2011 revival 
Shortly before the end of the Mercury division, Ford had been planning a revival of the Tracer model line as late as early 2010.  As Ford confirmed its 2012 model lines with its dealers that year, the Mercury division was to add a compact sedan derived from the 2012 Ford Focus as an additional sedan line. 

Slotted below the Milan, the Focus-derived Mercury was unofficially confirmed to adopt the Mercury Tracer nameplate (ending a 13-year hiatus).  As 2011 was the intended final year for the Grand Marquis, a 2012 Tracer would have returned Mercury to two sedan lines.

In the summer in 2010, Ford announced the withdrawal of the entire Mercury division, cancelling the possible revival of the Mercury Tracer.  Ford instead expanded the Focus range by introducing the premium Titanium trim level.

References

External links

Tracer
Front-wheel-drive vehicles
Compact cars
Hatchbacks
Sedans
Station wagons
1980s cars
1990s cars
Cars introduced in 1987
Cars discontinued in 1999